Ricardo Hector Asch (born 26 October 1947) is an obstetrician, gynecologist, and endocrinologist. He worked with reproductive technology and pioneered gamete intrafallopian transfer (GIFT), as well as working on research linking fertility and marijuana usage, and investigated the use of GnRH analogues with Andrew Schally. In the mid-1990s he was accused of transferring ova harvested from women into other patients without proper consent at the University of California, Irvine's fertility clinic. Asch left the United States one year before a federal indictment was filed.  He was tried and acquitted of all charges in Argentina in 2008. In 2011 Mexico denied an extradition request by the United States as it would constitute double jeopardy and no new evidence was brought forth.  He is currently living in Mexico City.

Education and early career
Born in Buenos Aires, Argentina, Asch studied at the University of Buenos Aires School of Medicine graduating in 1971. In 1975 he moved to the United States and worked with Robert Benjamin Greenblatt at the Medical College of Georgia before his reproductive endocrinology fellowship at the University of Texas Health Science Center at San Antonio. Among his many publications were his pioneering experience with GIFT and research on oocyte donation. In 1986 he joined the University of California, Irvine (UCI). In 1990 he became the Director of the Center for Reproductive Health of UCI heading the infertility program. Asch was named Assistant Dean of outreach at UCI, in charge of overseeing recruitment of minority students, the same year.  He lectured worldwide and accrued two honorary professorships by 1994.

UC Irvine fertility scandal

In 1995, the Orange County Register broke the story that Asch—then Chief of the University of California, Irvine's Center for Reproductive Health—and his two partners were accused of transferring women's eggs harvested from women into other patients without their permission. These eggs were fertilized and the resulting embryos transferred to these other women, some of them then conceiving. At least 15 live births resulted from the alleged practice. At that time, the misappropriation of human eggs was not legally considered a crime. However, numerous civil lawsuits were filed, and UCI paid out more than $27 million to settle patient claims. Asch disagreed with the settlements because they did not allow him to prove his innocence or repair his reputation.  Auditors from KPMG Peat Marwick investigated the clinic and found that almost $1 million in income at the clinic had not been reported. 

Asch was defended by students, and colleagues, including  Robert Edwards, who accused the media of convicting him before he was charged.

The Orange County Registers investigations into these practices led to that paper's receiving the 1996 Pulitzer Prize for Investigative Reporting. 

In 2006, university officials admitted to the Los Angeles Times that they had not notified at least 20 women whose eggs were allegedly used by Asch and his colleagues.

Aftermath 
Asch and colleagues Jose Balmaceda and Sergio Stone were indicted on charges of mail fraud and income tax evasion. Asch suspended his practice, sold his properties, and left for Mexico. Balmaceda escaped to Chile, while Stone stayed in the US and was convicted of insurance fraud in 1997 and paid a fine. In January 1996, Asch testified at a deposition in Tijuana that university employees were responsible for errors that had occurred such as mismatching patients and failing to obtain patient consents.

Asch later opened a practice in Mexico and later in Argentina. He was formally fired by the university in 2000. He attained a Mexican citizenship in 2001 in addition to his native Argentine citizenship.

Extradition efforts and acquittal

In 2004 Asch was arrested in Buenos Aires.  He was tried in Argentina and in 2008 was acquitted of all charges.<ref></ref</ref>  

Asch was arrested again in Mexico in November 2010. On December 30, 2010, the Mexican Attorney's General Office (PGR) announced on its website that it had initiated proceedings to have Asch extradited to the United States. However, Asch was released on bail in early 2011. Subsequently, the judge ruled that as Asch had already been tried in Argentina and acquitted, and as no new evidence was provided, the "double jeopardy" rule applied, thus Asch was free and would not be extradited to the United States.

Research
Asch worked with reproductive technology and pioneered gamete intrafallopian transfer (GIFT), a technique in which eggs are removed from a woman's ovaries, and placed in one of the Fallopian tubes, along with the man's sperm. He also worked on research linking marijuana and other drugs to hormone production, ovary function, and the effect on testicles in primates, and the possible negative effects of the usage of neuroactive drugs during adolescence and puberty. Asch worked with Andrew Schally understanding the effects of the Gonadotropin-releasing hormone (GnRH) in infertility and contraception in primates. In 1999 he worked on methods for giving birth to a healthy baby in couples with one HIV+ partner.

According to Scopus, Asch has an h-index of 46, and over 6700 citations, which would place him in the top 1% of researchers by citations in the Essential Science Indicators.

Awards and other activities
Asch, who owned an entertainment company at the time of the scandal, was one of the producers of the Andre Agassi and Nick Bollettieri instructional tennis video Attack.

See also
 University of California, Irvine School of Medicine#History
 Fertility fraud
  Gamete Intrafallopian Transfer (GIFT)

References

External links
 Pulitzer.org's archive The Register's stories exposing R. Asch
 Legal summary by R. Asch
 ricardoaschsupport.com Website supporting R. Asch
 "In Quest for Miracles, Did Fertility Clinic Go Too Far?" Los Angeles Times, 4 June 1995. Accessed 23 October 2009.

1947 births
Argentine emigrants to Mexico
Argentine endocrinologists
Argentine expatriates in Mexico
Argentine gynaecologists
Argentine Jews
Argentine obstetricians
Fugitives wanted by the United States
Fugitives wanted on fraud charges
Living people
People from Buenos Aires
University of Buenos Aires alumni
University of California, Irvine faculty
People acquitted of fraud